Thomas Francis Doyle (1893–1968) was a member of the New Zealand Legislative Council from 1936 to 1950.

Biography
Doyle was born in 1893. He was Mayor of Bluff for 14 years.

Doyle was a member of the Legislative Council from 9 March 1936 to 8 March 1943, and then 9 March 1943 to 8 March 1950. He was appointed by the First Labour Government. In 1944, he was appointed to the inaugural Invercargill Licensing Trust board.

Notes

References

1893 births
1968 deaths
Members of the New Zealand Legislative Council
New Zealand Labour Party MLCs
20th-century New Zealand politicians
Unsuccessful candidates in the 1935 New Zealand general election
Unsuccessful candidates in the 1957 New Zealand general election
Mayors of places in Southland, New Zealand
Invercargill Licensing Trust Board members